"Sanam Re" is an Indian Hindi-language song written and composed by Mithoon from the 2016 soundtrack album to the film of the same name. The song is sung by Arijit Singh. The track was officially released on 22 December 2015 as a video release.

Reception
In its review, Glamsham wrote, "Mithoon as always provides the perfect start to the album with the superlative title track which is naturally a romantic ballad, 'Sanam Re', the best romantic ditty for a while. Arijit's mellifluous vocals work their magic with the composer joining in. The musical arrangements are top class". Glamsham further rated the song as the best on the Sanam Re soundtrack. Komoi in its review wrote, "The title song of Sanam Re has a catchy quality to it. The song will appeal to many, who have a penchant for romantic songs. Composed by Mithoon, the song has been sung by Arijit Singh. 'Sanam Re' has a good variation when it comes to the beats. It sounds like one of the songs that can be easily found in a Bhatt film soundtrack. 'Sanam Re' is likable enough".

Legacy
The song has been sampled in several hip hop songs, particularly in the subgenre of drill. It was first sampled in "Exposing Me" (2018) by Chicago drill rapper Memo600, which was remixed in a 2019 version featuring King Von. Further remixes of "Exposing Me" were made by FBG Duck, featuring Rooga, and 22Gz. American rapper CJ sampled the song in his track "Whoopty" (2020). Other notable samples include "Vergeet De Buurt Nooit" by Lijpe and "Face To Face" by Italian rapper Rondodasosa.

Chart performance

Accolades

References

2015 songs
Arijit Singh songs
Hindi songs
Hindi film songs
Songs written by Mithoon
Songs written for films